Jean-Julien Rojer and Horia Tecău were the defending champions, but lost in the semifinals to Rajeev Ram and Joe Salisbury.

Ram and Salisbury went on to win the title, defeating Ben McLachlan and Jan-Lennard Struff in the final, 7–6(7–4), 6–3.

Seeds

Draw

Draw

Qualifying

Seeds

Qualifiers
  Jeevan Nedunchezhiyan /  Purav Raja

Qualifying draw

References

External Links
 Main draw
 Qualifying draw

Dubai Tennis Championships - Men's Doubles
2019 Dubai Tennis Championships